Xylopsora is a genus of lichenized fungi, belonging to the family Umbilicariaceae.

The genus was described in 2013 by Bendiksby and Timdal.

Species:
 Xylopsora canopeorum
 Xylopsora caradocensis
 Xylopsora friesii

References

Umbilicariales
Taxa described in 2013
Lecanoromycetes genera